A Fresh Air Romance is an American silent film produced by the Edison Company in 1912.

Plot
Old Dr. Fogg has been practicing medicine in the same small town for several decades when he takes his son, a recent medical school graduate, as a partner in his practice. The young doctor quickly realizes that his father's methods are outdated, and harmful, and tries to work around them. In the process, he finds romance with one of his father's patients.

Release
The film was released in the United States on October 12, 1912. It was exhibited in Aberaman, Wales in February, 1913. Around this same time, the film was still circulating through the United States, where it was being shown in places like the Dixie Theatre in Bryan, Texas.

References

External links
 

1912 films
1912 drama films
Silent American drama films
American black-and-white films
Medical-themed films
American silent short films
1910s American films